Paul de Longpré (1855–1911), was a French painter of flowers, who worked mainly in the United States.

Works 

De Longpré painted only perfect specimens of flowers. With a delicacy of touch and feeling for color he united scientific knowledge and art. He also knew how to give expression to the subtle essence of the flowers. Painting floral scenes almost exclusively in watercolors, in the 1900s de Longpre found inspiration in the 4,000 rose bushes he planted on his Hollywood estate. The finest of his paintings include Double Peach Blossoms and White Fringed Poppies (1902) – both widely known through popular reproductions.

Early life 
He was born in Lyon, France, in 1855, and was an entirely self-taught artist. From age 12, he practiced successfully in Paris as a painter of fans. In 1876, at 21, he first exhibited at the Paris Salon. Having lost his money by the failure of a Paris bank, he moved in 1890 to New York City and in 1896 held an exhibition of flower paintings which secured him instant recognition.

Life in Hollywood 
De Longpré arrived in Los Angeles, Southern California with his family in 1899. Daeida Wilcox, with husband H. H. Wilcox the founders of Hollywood, was so eager to attract culture to the town that she gave him her homesite for his estate, three lots on Cahuenga on the north of Prospect (later Hollywood Boulevard), in exchange for three of his paintings.

In 1901, Canadian architect Louis Bourgeois designed a landmark residence for the  estate, in the Mission Revival style. The house included an art gallery to sell prints of de Longpré's paintings, and was surrounded by the expansive "Le Roi de Fleur" flower gardens. Estate tours became a popular tourist destination off an exclusive Balloon Route trolley spur of the Los Angeles Pacific Railroad, that later became a Pacific Electric Redcar line, and with print sales additional sources of income for de Longpré.

Paul de Longpré is listed in the 1900 US Census, Los Angeles City Ward 5, Precincts 38 B and 73 A, with his wife Josephine and daughters Blance, Alice, and Pauline. His occupation is listed as Artist, but the last name is misspelled as De Lonpre, It indicates Paul, Josephine, Blance, and Alice were born in France, and Pauline was born in New York City. The architect Louis Bourgeois also taught French to de Longpré's daughters, and later married Alice.

Paul de Longpré died at home in Los Angeles at age 56, on 29 June 1911.

Afterwards, the family moved back to France. The increased property values in rapidly developing Hollywood resulted in demolition of the gardens by 1924, and the house in 1927.

Legacy 
In present-day Hollywood, the street De Longpre Avenue, and De Longpre Park on it are both named for him.

References

Further reading

External links 

 Paul de Longpré exhibition catalogs
 Artwork by Paul de Longpré
 Image-archeology.com: Paul de Longpre residence and gardens photographs

1855 births
1911 deaths
19th-century American painters
19th-century American male artists
19th-century French painters
20th-century American painters
20th-century French painters
20th-century American male artists
American male painters
Artists from Los Angeles
Flower artists
French Realist painters
French emigrants to the United States
French male painters
People from Hollywood, Los Angeles
Artists from Lyon
19th-century French male artists